Cathedral of the Holy Cross or Holy Cross Cathedral may refer to:

Africa
 Cathedral of the Holy Cross, Lagos, the Roman Catholic Cathedral in Lagos, Nigeria
 Cathedral of the Holy Cross, Lusaka, the Anglican cathedral in Lusaka, Zambia

Asia
 Cathedral of the Holy Cross, Gyumri, an Armenian Catholic cathedral in Gyumri, Armenia
 Armenian Cathedral of the Holy Cross, on Akdamar Island in Van Lake, Turkey

Europe
 Cathedral of the Holy Cross and Saint Eulalia, the Roman Catholic cathedral in Barcelona, Catalonia, Spain
 Church of the Holy Cross, Nin, the former Roman Catholic cathedral of Nin, Croatia
 Cathedral Basilica of the Holy Cross, Opole, Poland
 Temple of the Exaltation of the Holy Cross, a Greek Catholic cathedral in Bratislava, Slovakia
 Russian Church, Geneva, a Russian Orthodox cathedral in Geneva, Switzerland
 Greek Catholic Cathedral, Uzhhorod, Ukraine

North America
 Cathedral of the Holy Cross (Boston), the current Roman Catholic cathedral in Boston
 Holy Cross Church, Boston, the first Roman Catholic cathedral in Boston
 Metropolitan Cathedral Church of the Holy Cross, Our Lady of Regla, and St Francis of Assisi, the Roman Catholic cathedral in Chihuahua, Mexico
 Holy Cross Armenian Cathedral (Montebello, California), an Armenian Apostolic Church cathedral
 Holy Cross African Orthodox Pro-Cathedral, New York City
 Holy Cross Cathedral, Loganville, Georgia, the cathedral of the Anglican Diocese of the South

Oceania
 Holy Cross Cathedral, Geraldton, the cathedral of the Anglican Diocese of North West Australia, in Geraldton, Western Australia
 Holy Cross Pro-Cathedral, Vanimo, the pro-cathedral of the Roman Catholic Diocese of Vanimo, Papua New Guinea